Erhardt Stoettner (25 September 1899 – 6 January 1992) was a master craftsman and designer of stained glass windows for the T.C. Esser Studios in Milwaukee, Wisconsin.

Among the churches with windows designed by Stoettner are:
 1939: Mount St. Scholastica Chapel, Atchison, Kansas
 1942–1948: Grace Lutheran Church, River Forest, Illinois
 1951: Peace Lutheran Church, Oshkosh, Wisconsin
 1953: St. Bernard Church, Wabash, Indiana
 1954: St. Anthony's Memorial Hospital, Effingham, Illinois (see history brochure, pp. 24–31)
 1957: St. Peter in Chains Cathedral, Cincinnati, Ohio
 1964: Norway Lutheran Church, Wind Lake, Wisconsin (see history article pdf, page 108)
 1969: Grace Lutheran Church, South Range, Michigan
 Cathedral of St. John the Evangelist, Milwaukee, Wisconsin
 Lake Park Lutheran Church, Milwaukee, Wisconsin
 St. Helen Church, Chicago, Illinois
 St. Mark's Episcopal Church, Grand Rapids, Michigan

In the design and execution of these windows, three noted artists are deserving of recognition. Erhard Stoettner, German craftsman who, among other important works, helped in the restoration of the windows of the Cathedral of Notre Dame at Rheims, was the research artist who selected the colors and regulated other technical details. The design of both windows and figures is the work of Gerard Recke, an American artist, who designed the windows in the chapel of Princeton University. Joseph Freney of Dublin, Ireland, was the artist who painted the faces and figures in the windows.

An archived letter to Stoettner about the price of a window.
NOTE: Gerard Recke is also known as Gustave Recke.

References

1899 births
1992 deaths
American stained glass artists and manufacturers